Xun You (157–September 214), courtesy name Gongda, was a statesman who lived during the late Eastern Han dynasty of China and served as an adviser to the warlord Cao Cao. Born in the influential Xun family of Yingchuan Commandery (around present-day Xuchang, Henan), Xun You was recruited into the civil service by the general He Jin. When the warlord Dong Zhuo hijacked and controlled the Han central government between 189 and 192, Xun You plotted with four others to assassinate him but was discovered and imprisoned. Following his release after Dong Zhuo's death, he wanted to serve as the Administrator of Shu Commandery (around present-day Chengdu, Sichuan) but eventually settled as an official in Jing Province.

In 196, after Cao Cao received the figurehead Han sovereign, Emperor Xian, and reestablished the new imperial capital in Xu (許; present-day Xuchang, Henan), he summoned Xun You to the capital to serve as a Master of Writing and Military Adviser. From then on, Xun You was simultaneously a Han statesman and a subordinate of Cao Cao. He accompanied Cao Cao on his military campaigns as a tactical adviser and occasional commander. Between 198 and 207, he advised Cao Cao in the battles against rival warlords such as Zhang Xiu, Lü Bu, Yuan Shao and Yuan Shao's successors. In 207, on Cao Cao's recommendation, Emperor Xian made Xun You a village marquis to honour him for his contributions. In 213, after Cao Cao had been enfeoffed by Emperor Xian as the Duke of Wei, Xun You served as the Prefect of the Masters of Writing in Cao Cao's dukedom. In 214, while accompanying Cao Cao on a campaign against the southern warlord Sun Quan, Xun You died of illness along the way. Described as a highly profound and insightful thinker, Xun You was also known for keeping a very low profile and hiding his true talents and achievements behind the façade of a foolish, cowardly and weak person.

Historical sources on Xun You's life
The authoritative historical source on Xun You's life is his official biography in volume 10 of the Records of the Three Kingdoms (Sanguozhi), which was written by Chen Shou in the third century.

In the fifth century, Pei Songzhi annotated the Sanguozhi by incorporating information from other sources to Chen Shou's original work and adding his personal commentary. Some alternative texts used in the annotations to the Sanguozhi include: the Wei Shu (魏書; Book of Wei), by Wang Shen, Xun Yi and Ruan Ji; the Xun Shi Jia Zhuan (荀氏家傳; Xun Family Genealogy); the Han Ji (漢紀; Annals of Han), by Zhang Fan; the Fu Zi, by Fu Xuan.

Family background and childhood
Xun You was born in the influential Xun family, whose ancestral home was in Yingyin County, Yingchuan Commandery, which is in present-day Xuchang, Henan. His grandfather, Xun Tan, whose courtesy name was Yuanzhi, served as the Administrator of Guangling Commandery (廣陵郡; around present-day Huai'an, Jiangsu). Xun You's father, Xun Yi, served as a commandery-level Assistant Officer. Xun Yi was a second cousin of Xun Yu, hence Xun You was Xun Yu's second cousin-nephew even though he was six years older than Xun Yu.

Xun You was orphaned at a young age. He was probably raised by his uncle Xun Qu and his grandfather Xun Tan. When his grandfather died, a minor administrative assistant, Zhang Quan, offered to be the tomb keeper. Xun You, who was 12 years old then, sensed that something was wrong. He told his uncle Xun Qu, "This man looks suspicious. I believe he's up to something." Upon investigation, it was revealed that Zhang Quan was actually a murderer on the run. Because of this incident, the young Xun You was seen as an extraordinary boy. When Xun You was six or seven, Xun Qu once accidentally injured him while he was drunk. Since then, every time Xun You left or entered his home, he would do so at times to deliberately avoid meeting his uncle. Xun Qu was very surprised by his nephew's intelligence when he heard about it.

Early career
When the general He Jin rose to power in 189 and became regent to the child Emperor Shao, he recruited over 20 notable members of scholar-gentry background to join the civil service. Xun You was one of them. He was appointed as a Gentleman of the Yellow Gate in the imperial capital, Luoyang. However, within the same year, He Jin was assassinated by the eunuch faction led by the Ten Attendants. The warlord Dong Zhuo took advantage of the ensuing political turmoil to hijack and control the central government. Between 190 and 191, several regional warlords formed a coalition and launched a campaign against Dong Zhuo in the name of saving the emperor. Dong Zhuo ordered Luoyang to be burnt down and relocated the capital to Chang'an. In Chang'an, Xun You secretly plotted with Zheng Tai, He Yong, Chong Ji and Wu Qiong to assassinate Dong Zhuo, who was notorious for his cruelty and tyranny. However, they were discovered and Xun You was arrested and imprisoned. While he was incarcerated, Xun You spoke and behaved normally as though nothing had happened. He was only released after Dong Zhuo was killed in 192. However, the Wei Shu mentioned that Xun You was released after he sent someone to persuade and convince Dong Zhuo to free him.

Xun You then resigned and returned home, but soon rejoined the civil service and was appointed as the Chancellor of Rencheng State (任城; southwest of present-day Zoucheng, Shandong). He rejected this appointment and asked to be the Administrator of Shu Commandery (蜀郡; around present-day Chengdu, Sichuan) because he heard that Shu Commandery was prosperous and situated in a geographically strategic location. However, he was unable to travel to Shu Commandery because the roads leading there had been damaged and cut off. He had no choice but to relocate to Jing Province and station there.

Service under Cao Cao
In 196, the warlord Cao Cao received and fetched Emperor Xian to Xu (許; present-day Xuchang, Henan) and established the new capital there. He wrote to Xun You: "The Empire is in chaos. It is time for intelligent people to do something. Do you not think you have spent too much time observing the changes in the Shu region?" Xun You was then appointed as the Administrator of Runan Commandery (汝南郡; around present-day Gushi County, Henan) and later summoned to the capital to serve as a Master of Writing. Cao Cao had long heard of Xun You and was overjoyed when they finally met. He told Xun Yu and Zhong Yao: "Gongda is no ordinary person. Now that I have him to advise me, why should I worry about not being able to pacify the Empire?" He also appointed Xun You as a Military Adviser.

Battles against Zhang Xiu and Lü Bu

In 198, when Cao Cao wanted to launch another attack on a rival warlord, Zhang Xiu, Xun You advised him against it, saying, "Zhang Xiu and Liu Biao share borders. Zhang Xiu and his wandering army rely on Liu Biao for supplies. Liu Biao is unable to provide for them so they will eventually fall out. Why not wait and try to induce Zhang Xiu to surrender to you? When Zhang Xiu ends up in a desperate situation, Liu Biao will definitely support him." Cao Cao ignored Xun You's advice and attacked Zhang Xiu at Rang County (穰縣; present-day Dengzhou, Henan). Just as Xun You predicted, when Zhang Xiu's situation became more desperate, Liu Biao sent reinforcements to help him and put Cao Cao's attacking forces in a disadvantageous position. Cao Cao told Xun You that he regretted not listening to his advice. He then changed tactics, attacked Zhang Xiu again, and defeated him the second time.

In the same year, after defeating Zhang Xiu and Liu Biao, Cao Cao wanted to move on to attack another rival warlord, Lü Bu. Many of his subordinates thought that it was too dangerous. However, Xun You had a different opinion. He believed that Zhang Xiu and Liu Biao had yet to recover from their recent defeat and would not make any further moves. He also pointed out that even though Lü Bu was a formidable warrior and had support from the warlord Yuan Shu, relations between them had recently deteriorated, so it was an opportune moment for Cao Cao to attack Lü Bu. Lü Bu defeated Liu Bei and received help from Zang Ba.

During the Battle of Xiapi, Cao Cao defeated Lü Bu in the initial stages and forced him to retreat back to Xiapi Commandery (下邳郡; south of present-day Pizhou, Jiangsu). Cao Cao then laid siege to Xiapi and launched several attacks but was unable to breach the city walls. As his troops grew weary, Cao Cao considered withdrawing. However, Xun You and Guo Jia advised him, "Lü Bu is brave but foolhardy. His forces' morale is very low after suffering consecutive defeats. An army's morale depends on its commander's will to fight on. Chen Gong is intelligent but slow. Since Lü Bu's army's morale hasn't recovered yet and Chen Gong hasn't finalised his plans yet, you can eventually defeat Lü Bu if you continue attacking him." Cao Cao then ordered his troops to dig ditches and redirect the waters of the Yi and Si rivers to flood Xiapi. Xiapi fell quickly and Lü Bu was captured alive and executed.

Battles against the Yuan family

In 200 CE, war broke out between Cao Cao and the northern warlord Yuan Shao. At the Battle of Boma, Xun You suggested that Cao Cao use a diversionary tactic to eliminate Yuan Shao's general Yan Liang; the battle ended with victory for Cao Cao and Yan Liang's death at the hands of Guan Yu. After the victory at Boma, Cao Cao and his forces headed west with their baggage train along the south banks of the Yellow River. Yuan Shao sent his troops across the river to raid the baggage train and they encountered Cao Cao. Cao Cao's subordinates were shocked and they asked him to head back to protect his camp. Xun You said, "This is an opportunity to capture the enemy! Why should we retreat?" Cao Cao looked at Xun You and laughed. He then ordered his troops to use their baggage as bait to lure Yuan Shao's forces into a trap. At the Battle of Yan Ford, when Yuan Shao's soldiers were scrambling for the baggage, Cao Cao sent his infantry and cavalry forces to attack them and scored a major victory; Yuan Shao's general Wen Chou was killed in action. Cao Cao then retreated to Guandu (官渡; northeast of present-day Zhongmu County, Henan); Yuan Shao laid siege to Guandu.

As both sides reached a stalemate at Guandu and Cao Cao's forces ran out of supplies, Xun You advised Cao Cao, "Yuan Shao's supplies will be reaching in one day. Han Xun (韓𦳣), the officer leading the convoy, tends to underestimate the enemy. He can be easily defeated." Xun You also recommended Cao Cao's general Xu Huang to lead the attack on Han Xun. Cao Cao sent Xu Huang and Shi Huan to raid Han Xun's convoy and they burnt the supplies. Later, Yuan Shao's adviser Xu You defected to Cao Cao's side and urged Cao to attack Yuan's supply depot at Wuchao (烏巢; southeast of present-day Yanjin County, Henan), which was guarded by Chunyu Qiong. While Cao Cao's other subordinates were suspicious about Xu You, only Xun You and Jia Xu advised Cao to heed Xu You's suggestion. Cao Cao then ordered Xun You and Cao Hong to remain behind to guard his main camp, while he personally led his forces to attack Wuchao and succeeded in destroying Yuan Shao's supplies and killed Chunyu Qiong in battle. As the tide turned against Yuan Shao, two of his generals, Zhang He and Gao Lan, destroyed their own camps and led their men to defect and surrender to Cao Cao's side. When Zhang He and Gao Lan showed up at Cao Cao's main camp, Cao Hong felt suspicious and was reluctant to accept their surrender. Xun You told Cao Hong, "Zhang He was angry that Yuan Shao did not listen to him so he decided to defect. Sir, what's there to suspect about him?" Cao Hong then accepted their surrender.

After Yuan Shao's death in June 202, Cao Cao launched a campaign against Yuan's sons Yuan Tan and Yuan Shang and defeated them at the Battle of Liyang. In the following year, when Cao Cao was planning to attack Liu Biao, he received news that Yuan Tan and Yuan Shang had started fighting over control of Ji Province. Yuan Tan sent his adviser Xin Pi to convey to Cao Cao his wish to surrender and seek aid from Cao in countering his brother. Cao Cao considered accepting Yuan Tan's surrender and sending troops to aid him, and then consulted his advisers. Most of them thought that Liu Biao was more powerful and that Yuan Tan and Yuan Shang posed no threat, so they urged Cao Cao to attack Liu Biao first. Xun You had a different opinion from them. He said, "The Empire has experienced so much turmoil, yet Liu Biao has holed up in the Jiang and Han regions. This shows that he has no intention of expanding his territory. The Yuans occupy four provinces and have 100,000 troops. Yuan Shao had treated his subordinates generously and hoped that his sons would cooperate harmoniously to safeguard his territories; that was why turmoil in the Empire never seemed to end. As of now, relations between the brothers have deteriorated and they seek to destroy each other. If one of them defeats and absorbs the other, he will become more powerful and more difficult to defeat. If you take advantage of their internal conflict to defeat them, you will restore stability in the Empire. You shouldn't miss this great opportunity." Cao Cao agreed, accepted Yuan Tan's surrender and led his forces to attack Yuan Shang. Yuan Tan later rebelled against Cao Cao but was defeated and killed at the Battle of Nanpi in 205.

Later life and death
After pacifying Ji Province, Cao Cao wrote a memorial to Emperor Xian to recommend him to award Xun You a marquis title to honour him for his contributions. Xun You was thus enfeoffed as the Marquis of Lingshu Village. In 207, while assessing his subordinates' contributions and recommending Emperor Xian to give out rewards accordingly, Cao Cao credited Xun Yu and Xun You for developing grand strategic plans for him. Xun You received an additional 400 taxable households in his marquisate, making it 700 households in total. He was also reassigned to serve as Central Military Adviser. The Wei Shu recorded that Cao Cao visited Xun You's residence when he returned from Liucheng (柳城; southwest of present-day Chaoyang, Liaoning) after a campaign. He told Xun You, "Now that the Empire has basically been pacified, it's time for me to share the rewards with virtuous scholar-officials like you. In the past, Emperor Gaozu allowed Zhang Zifang to choose 30,000 taxable households to form his own marquisate. Today, I intend to suggest to the Emperor to let you do the same."

In 213, Emperor Xian enfeoffed Cao Cao as the Duke of Wei and granted him a dukedom covering parts of present-day Hebei and Henan. Xun You was appointed as the Prefect of the Masters of Writing. In 214, Xun You accompanied Cao Cao on a campaign against the southern warlord Sun Quan but died of illness along the way. He was 58 (by East Asian age reckoning) when he died. Cao Cao shed tears when he heard of Xun You's death.

During the Zhengshi era (240–249) of the reign of Cao Fang, Xun You was posthumously honoured as "Marquis Jing" (敬侯; "respected marquis").

Appraisal
Xun You was known for being a highly profound and insightful thinker who hid secrets very well. Since he started accompanying Cao Cao on his military campaigns, he had often helped Cao Cao devise and develop strategic plans. Many people, including his family members and relatives, hardly knew what was on his mind or what he had said. The Wei Shu recorded that Xin Tao, a maternal cousin of Xun You, once asked Xun You why he urged Cao Cao to attack Ji Province. Xun You replied, "Since Zuozhi has come on behalf of Yuan Tan to surrender, it's expected that the Imperial Army will go there to pacify the area. How would I know why?" Xin Tao and others did not dare to ask Xun You again about state and military affairs after that.

Cao Cao often praised Xun You and once said, "Gongda is intelligent but appears foolish; he is courageous but appears cowardly; he is resilient but appears weak. He neither flaunts his talents nor brags about his achievements. You may be as intelligent as him, but you can't pretend to be foolish as well as he does. Even Master Yan and Ning Wu cannot be compared to him." When Cao Pi was still Cao Cao's heir apparent, his father told him, "Xun Gongda is a role model for people. You should treat him courteously and respectfully." When Xun You was ill, Cao Pi visited him and knelt down beside his bed; such was Cao Pi's level of respect for Xun You. Zhong Yao also once said, "Every time I plan something, I'll carefully think through it again and again until I'm certain that I can't make any more changes. However, after consulting Gongda, he always has new insights to offer." Xun You created 12 strategies for Zhong Yao. Zhong Yao died before he managed to finish writing a book about the 12 strategies, hence some of them were lost. The historian Pei Songzhi thought it was a huge pity that Xun You's strategies were lost because Zhong Yao died at the age of 79 – some 16 years after Xun You's death – so he probably should have had ample time to finish writing the book.

The Wei Shu recorded that Cao Cao once said, "I have travelled with Xun Gongda for over 20 years. I can't find any fault with him." He also said, "Xun Gongda is truly a virtuous man; he fits the saying '(he is) benign, upright, courteous, temperate, and complaisant and thus he gets what he desires.' He is exactly the man described in this quote by Confucius: 'Yan Ping Zhong knew well how to maintain friendly intercourse. The acquaintance might be long, but he showed the same respect as at first.'"

The Xun Yu Biezhuan (荀彧別傳; Unofficial Biography of Xun Yu) recorded that Cao Cao once commended Xun Yu and Xun You for their excellent judgments about people's talents and said he would never forget them for their contributions.

The Fu Zi mentioned that someone, who lived around the same time as Xun You, once asked if there were any virtuous junzis in their time. He received an answer as follows: "The benevolence of Lord Prefect Xun (Yu) and the intelligence of Military Adviser Xun (You) make them worthy of being called virtuous junzis of our time. Lord Prefect Xun is benevolent and virtuous, he displays wisdom in recommending talents, his personal conduct is flawless, and he is capable of adapting his strategies to suit changes. Meng Ke once said, 'It is a rule that a true royal sovereign should arise in the course of five hundred years, and that during that time there should be men illustrious in their generation.' Lord Prefect Xun is one of such men. As Taizu once said, 'Lord Prefect Xun provides advice and doesn't stop providing advice; Military Adviser Xun eliminates evil and doesn't stop eliminating evil.'"

Chen Shou, who wrote Xun You's biography in the Sanguozhi, appraised him as follows: "Xun You and Jia Xu were very detailed in their strategising and had never miscalculated before. However, in terms of adaptability and flexibility, they were second to (Zhang) Liang and (Chen) Ping."

Family

Xun You had at least three sons. The eldest, Xun Ji, resembled his father in character but died early. The second, Xun Shi, inherited his father's title "Marquis of Lingshu Village" and had no son to succeed him when he died. In the early Huangchu era (220-226) of Cao Pi's reign, Xun You's grandson, Xun Biao, inherited the title "Marquis of Lingshu Village" and received 300 taxable households to form his marquisate. His title was later changed to "Marquis of Qiuyang Village".

See also
 Lists of people of the Three Kingdoms

Notes

References
Citations from the Sanguozhi

Citations from the Sanguozhi zhu

Other citations

 Chen, Shou (3rd century). Records of the Three Kingdoms (Sanguozhi).
 
 Pei, Songzhi (5th century). Annotations to Records of the Three Kingdoms (Sanguozhi zhu).
 Sima, Guang (1084). Zizhi Tongjian.

Officials under Cao Cao
157 births
214 deaths
Political office-holders in Henan
2nd-century Chinese people
3rd-century Chinese people